Volusenus is a name that may refer to:

Gaius Volusenus (fl. mid-1st century BCE), distinguished military officer of the Roman Republic who served under Julius Caesar for ten years, during the Gallic Wars and the civil war of the 40s
Florentius Volusenus (c. 1504 – 1546 or 1547), Scottish humanist